Hitara (pinyin: Xitala), earlier known as Hitan (溪滩氏, pinyin: xitanshi), was a clan of Manchu nobility belonging to the Manchu Plain White Banner. Due to the marriage of Empress Xuan to the Jurchen chieftain Taksi, the clan was called "Old Maiden House". Their ancestral homes were located in the Changbai Mountains, Niyaman Mountains and Dong'e valley, from the beginning of Ming dynasty. After the demise of the Qing dynasty, descendants of this clan changed their surnames to Zhao (赵), Tu (图), Wen (文), Qi (齐/祁), Sun (孙), Zhu (祝), Xi (希/喜/奚), Liu (刘), Xian (线) and other names.

Notable figures

Males

 Anggoduli Gayan
Bayan (巴颜)
 Jindou (金都)
 Gudou (古都), father of Empress Zhi
 Cancha (参察)
 A'gu (阿古), father of Empress Xuan
 Sabitu (萨璧图)
 Kuli（库理) 
 Laibao (来保), a member of Grand Council of State, a secretary in the Ministry of Public Works and a Grand Secretary of Wuying hall

Chang'an (常安)
He'erjing'e (和爾經額/和尔经额), served as a second rank literary official (總管/总管, pinyin:zongguan) in the Imperial Household Department and a second rank military official (副都統/副都统，pinyin: fudutong), and held the title of a third class Cheng'en duke (三等公)
Shengzhu (盛住)
Mengzhu (孟住)

Yulu (裕录), served as second class military official and governor of Anhui.
Xichen (熙臣)
Xiyuan (熙元), served as a Shujishi in 1889

Prince Consorts

Females
Imperial Consorts
 Empress
 Empress Xiaoshurui (1760–1797), the Jiaqing Emperor's first empress, the mother of second daughter (1780–1783), the Daoguang Emperor (1782–1850) and Princess Zhuangjing (1784–1811)

Gallery

References

Manchu clans

Plain White Banner